Emma Copley Eisenberg is a queer American writer of fiction and nonfiction works. Her first book, The Third Rainbow Girl, was nominated for an Edgar Award, Lambda Literary Award, and Anthony Bouchercon Award.

Personal life 
Copley Eisenberg was raised in New York City and currently resides in Philadelphia.

In 2007, as a college student, Copley Eisenberg completed an internship in Pocahontas County, West Virginia, the location of her book, The Third Rainbow Girl. The experience lingered with her, and she returned in 2009 and lived there until 2011, during which time she served as an AmeriCorps member and worked "as a counselor at a girls’ wilderness and empowerment camp."

Education 
Copley Eisenberg received a bachelor of arts from Haverford College and an MFA from the University of Virginia.

Career 
Aside from writing, Copley Eisenberg has taught fiction writing at Bryn Mawr College, the University of Virginia, and ZYZZYVA.

In 2018, along with several other writers, Copley Eisenberg co-founded Blue Stoop, an organization that "nurtures an inclusive literary community by creating pathways to access writing education, inspiration, and professional support, and celebrating Philadelphia’s rich writing tradition." She currently co-directs at the organization.

Copley Eisenberg also teaches a bi-monthly course called Reporting for Creative Writers.

Writing 
Copley Eisenberg's work has appeared in The New York Times, McSweeney's, Granta, The Virginia Quarterly Review, Tin House, Esquire, Guernica, The Washington Post, The Philadelphia Citizen, and others.

The Third Rainbow Girl (2020) 

Copley Eisenberg's debut book, The Third Rainbow Girl: The Long Life of a Double Murder in Appalachia, was published January 21, 2020, by Hachette Books. The book follows the true story of the murders of Vicki Durian and Nancy Santomero in Pocahontas County, West Virginia in June 1980 when the duo had been hitchhiking to the Rainbow Gathering. Though no one was prosecuted for the "Rainbow Murders" for 13 years, many suspected local residents who were "depicted as poor, dangerous, and backward." A local farmer was convicted in 1993 but was released when Joseph Paul Franklin confessed to the crime. Throughout the story's telling, Copley Eisenberg provides insight into the harmful stories told and believed about people who live in Appalachia. She also discusses how "this mysterious murder has loomed over all those affected for generations, shaping their fears, fates, and desires."

The Third Rainbow Girl was nominated for an Edgar Award for Best Fact Crime, a Lambda Literary Award for Bisexual Nonfiction, and an Anthony Bouchercon Award. The New York Times  included the book in its list of notable books released in 2020.

References

External links 

 Official website

Living people
American LGBT writers
Year of birth missing (living people)
University of Virginia alumni
Haverford College alumni